Alice Zoe Monaghan (born 20 March 2000) is an English cricketer who currently plays for Hampshire, Oxfordshire, Southern Vipers and London Spirit. An all-rounder, she is a right-handed batter and right-arm medium bowler. She previously played for Yorkshire Diamonds and Loughborough Lightning in the Women's Cricket Super League.

Early life
Monaghan was born on 20 March 2000 in Basingstoke, Hampshire.

Domestic career
Monaghan made her county debut in 2016, for Hampshire against Somerset in a Twenty20 Cup match. In her first County Championship match that same season, she hit what remains her List A high score, of 43*. She was part of the Hampshire side that gained promotion from Division 2 of the County Championship in 2017, and subsequently won Division 1 the following season in 2018. In 2017 she also took her best List A bowling figures, of 4/22 against Staffordshire. She played six matches for the side in the 2021 Women's Twenty20 Cup, scoring 42 runs and taking two wickets. She was ever-present in the 2022 Women's Twenty20 Cup, scoring 76 runs and taking four wickets. She joined Oxfordshire for the South Central Counties Cup, a 50-over tournament involving the counties in the South of England. She top-scored for Oxfordshire with 44 from 44 deliveries in the opening round of the tournament.

Monaghan also played for Yorkshire Diamonds in the 2018 Women's Cricket Super League, appearing in four matches. In 2019 she was part of the Loughborough Lightning squad, but did not play a match.

In 2020, Monaghan played for Southern Vipers in the Rachael Heyhoe Flint Trophy. She appeared in all 7 matches as her side won the competition, scoring 11 runs and bowling 4 overs. She played seven times for the side in 2021, across the Rachael Heyhoe Flint Trophy and the Charlotte Edwards Cup, scoring 35 runs and taking one wicket. She also played for London Spirit in The Hundred, appearing in six matches. Monaghan missed her university graduation to be at London Spirit's match against Northern Superchargers at Lord's, so the team instead celebrated together on the dressing room balcony after the match. She played three matches for Southern Vipers in 2022, all in the Rachael Heyhoe Flint Trophy. She also played six matches for London Spirit in The Hundred.

References

External links

2000 births
Living people
Cricketers from Basingstoke
Hampshire women cricketers
Oxfordshire women cricketers
Yorkshire Diamonds cricketers
Loughborough Lightning cricketers
Southern Vipers cricketers
London Spirit cricketers